The 2020 Missouri Tigers softball team represents the University of Missouri in the 2020 NCAA Division I softball season. The Tigers play their home games at Mizzou Softball Stadium.

Previous season

The Tigers finished the 2019 season 35–25 overall, and 12–12 in the SEC to finish in a tie for sixth in the conference. The Tigers went 3–2 in the Los Angeles Regional during the 2019 NCAA Division I softball tournament.

Preseason

SEC preseason poll
The SEC preseason poll was released on January 15, 2020.

Schedule and results

Source:
*Rankings are based on the team's current ranking in the NFCA poll.

Rankings

References

Missouri
Missouri Tigers softball seasons
Missouri Tigers softball